AFCAA may refer to
U.S. Air Force Cost Analysis Agency
AFCAA REVIC, a set of programs for estimating the cost of software development projects
AFC Ann Arbor, an American association football club
Argentine Film Critics Association Award